Code page 1012 (CCSID 1012), also known as CP1012 or I7DEC, is IBM's code page for the Italian version of ISO 646, also known as ISO 646-IT IR 15. The character set was originally specified in UNI 0204-70. It is also part of DEC's National Replacement Character Set (NRCS) for their VT220 terminals.

Code page layout

References

1012